Maria Leonidovna Pakhomenko (25 March 1937 – 8 March 2013) was a Soviet and Russian singer, a holder of the title of People's Artist of Russia since 1999.

The song that brought her fame was Kachaet, kachaet... that she recorded for the theater play Idu na Grozu in 1963. In the 1960-1980s, Maria Pakhomenko was one of the major stars of the Soviet stage. The songs in her performance sounded in the programs of many radio stations and on television. She toured the USSR and abroad for many years (she sang in France, Italy, Cuba, Yugoslavia, Poland, Germany, Czechoslovakia, Bulgaria, Finland). Several music films were shot about her, one of which was acquired by 13 countries.

Among the songs by leading Soviet composers of which she was the original performer are Love Will Stay (by Valery Gavrilin), Nenaglyadnyy Moy (by Aleksandra Pakhmutova), Mens (by Eduard Kolmanovsky), Conversations   (by Eduard Khanok), Vals pri Svechakh (by Oscar Feltsman), etc.

Career highlights 
In 1968, she sold 2,600,000 discs. In 1971, Pakhomenko became the first of Soviet singers to win the Grand Prix at the Golden Orpheus song contest.

References

External links

 Биография и фильмография на сайте Кино-Театр. Ру

1937 births
2013 deaths
People from Krasnapolle District
Soviet women singers
People's Artists of Russia
Deaths from pneumonia in Russia
20th-century Russian women singers
20th-century Russian singers